John Capstick may refer to:

John H. Capstick, American politician
John Walton Capstick, bursar of Trinity College, Cambridge